The men's doubles of the 2011 Strabag Prague Open tournament was played on clay in Prague, Czech Republic.

Lukáš Dlouhý and Petr Pála were the defending champions from the last edition in 2008, but decided not to participate.
František Čermák and Lukáš Rosol won the title after defeating Christopher Kas and Alexander Peya 6–3, 6–4 in the final.

Seeds

Draw

Draw

External Links
 Main Draw

Strabag Prague Open - Doubles
2011 - Men's Doubles